Pohja is a former municipality of Finland.

It may also refer to
Põhja, a village in northern Estonia
Põhja-Kõrvemaa Nature Reserve in northern Estonia
Põhja-Tallinn, an administrative district of Tallinn, the capital of Estonia
Antti Pohja (born 1977), Finnish football player
Pohja (myth), also known as Pohjola, place (or person) in finnish myth

See also
Pohjola, a former municipality in Finland